The following is a list of international schools in China.

Beijing 

Beanstalk International Bilingual School
Beijing BISS International School
Beijing City International School
Beijing International Bilingual Academy
British School of Beijing
Beijing Royal School
Canadian International School of Beijing
Daystar Academy
Deutsche Botschaftsschule Peking
Dulwich College Beijing
Harrow International School Beijing
International School of Beijing
Japanese School of Beijing
Korean International School in Beijing
Lycée Français International de Pékin
Saint Paul American School
Tsinghua International School
Western Academy of Beijing
Yew Chung International School of Beijing

Jiujiang 

Kuling American School
Chefoo School Kuling Campus
Jiujiang Foreign Language School International Division
Jiujiang Tongwen Middle School International Division
Jiujiang No.1 School International Division

Changzhou 

Changzhou Trina International School
Oxford International College of Changzhou

Chengdu 

Chengdu International School
Léman International School - Chengdu
Oxford International College of Chengdu
QSI International School of Chengdu

Chongqing 

Yew Chung International School of Chongqing

Dalian 
 Japanese School of Dalian
 Dalian American International School

Foshan 
 Lady Eleanor Holles International School Foshan

Guangzhou 

 Alcanta International College
 American International School of Guangzhou
 The British School of Guangzhou
 Canadian International School of Guangzhou
 Guangzhou Korean School
 Guangzhou Nanhu International School
 Huamei-Bond International College
 Japanese School of Guangzhou
 Utahloy International School of Guangzhou
 Fettes College Guangzhou
 Utahloy International School Zengcheng

Hangzhou 

Hangzhou International School
Wahaha International School

Kunming 

Kunming International Academy

Nanjing 

British International School of Nanjing
Nanjing International School

Ningbo 

Access International Academy Ningbo
Huamao Multicultural Education Academy
Ningbo Zhicheng School International

Qingdao 

 International School of Qingdao
 Qingdao Amerasia International School
 Yew Chung International School of Qingdao

Sanya 

 International School of Sanya

Shanghai

Shenyang 

 Shenyang Transformation International School
 QSI

Shenzhen 

International School of Nanshan Shenzhen
Japanese School of Shenzhen
QSI International School of Shekou
Shekou International School
Shen Wai International School
Shenzhen College of International Education

Suzhou 

Dulwich College Suzhou
Japanese School of Suzhou
Suzhou Singapore International School
Ulink College Suzhou

Tianjin

International School of Tianjin
TEDA International School
Tianjin International School
 Wellington College International Tianjin

Weihai
Zhongshi International School

Wuhan 

 Wuhan Yangtze International School
 Wuhan Ulink College of China Optics Valley
 Wuhan Maple Leaf International School
 Wuhan French International School

Xiamen 

Manila Xiamen International School
Xiamen International School

Xi'an 

Xi'an Hanova International School
Xi'an International School

See also 

 List of international schools in Hong Kong
 List of international schools

References

 
International
International schools
China